Assegaj is a monotypic genus of moths in the family Cossidae. Its sole species is Assegaj clenchi, which is found in Cameroon, the Republic of Congo and Nigeria.

The length of the forewings is 21–23 mm. The forewings are brown, with a light-brown band, rimmed by a black streak. The hindwings are uniform brown.

Etymology
The genus name is derived from assegai, an African spear with a wide tip, and refers to the peculiar structure of the uncus. The species is named in honour of H. K. Clench.

References

Natural History Museum Lepidoptera generic names catalog

Cossinae
Monotypic moth genera
Moths of Africa